Dead Wood is a 2007 British horror film, written, produced and directed by Richard Stiles and David Bryant and starring Emily Juniper, Fergus March, Rebecca Craven, Nina Kwok and John Samuel Worsey with Bryant appearing in a small role.  Dead Wood was shown at film festivals across Italy, the UK and the United States, before being released on DVD throughout Europe and North America in 2009.

Synopsis 
Four friends leave the city for a relaxing camping weekend in the woods. Once they get settled, a strange young woman enters their campsite looking for her lost boyfriend. One of the four himself goes missing and the rest are pitted against mysterious forces in a fight for their very survival.

Cast 
 Fergus March as Webb
 Emily Juniper as Larri
 John Samuel Worsey as Milk
 Rebecca Craven as Jess
 Nina Kwok as Ketsy
 David Bryant as Rob
 Jay Worthy as Driver
 Leighton Wise as Forestry Foreman

Recognition

Awards and nominations
The film won the 'B-Movie Award' for 'Best Digital Effects' at the 2007 B-Movie Film Festival in Syracuse, New York.

Reception
Reception for the film has been mixed, with Total Sci-Fi Online saying Dead Wood was "Plodding in places and overly reminiscent of Blair Witch in others, Bryant and co. are nevertheless a team to watch." Dread Central praised the film's "strong performances" but criticized Dead Wood's "slow beginning". DVD Talk also reviewed the film, saying Dead Wood "has a near equal number of strengths and weaknesses" but that due to the extras the movie was "a mild recommendation for the horror crowd." Fatally Yours wrote "despite not liking the first half of the film I admit I am glad to have seen Dead Wood."

References

External links
 
 
 

2007 films
British horror films
2007 horror films
British independent films
2000s teen horror films
2000s English-language films
2000s British films